Sophie Michelle Ellis-Bextor (born 10 April 1979) is an English singer and songwriter. She first came to prominence in the late 1990s as the lead singer of the indie rock band Theaudience. After the group disbanded Ellis-Bextor went solo and achieved success beginning in the early 2000s. Her music is a mixture of mainstream pop, disco, nu-disco, and 1980s electronic influences.

Ellis-Bextor's debut solo album, Read My Lips, was released in 2001. It peaked at number two on the UK Albums Chart and was certified double platinum by the British Phonographic Industry; it sold 1.5 million copies worldwide. Three of its four singles—the Cher cover "Take Me Home", "Murder on the Dancefloor", and the double A-side "Get Over You" / "Move This Mountain"—reached the top three in the UK. In 2003, Read My Lips won the Edison Award for Best Dance Album. Its follow-up Shoot from the Hip (2003) reached number 19 in the UK and spawned two top ten singles, "Mixed Up World" and "I Won't Change You".

Ellis-Bextor's third studio album, Trip the Light Fantastic (2007), peaked at number seven in the UK and its lead single "Catch You" reached the top ten. Her fourth studio album, Make a Scene (2011), and its third single "Bittersweet" achieved top 40 positions in the UK. Her fifth studio album, Wanderlust (2014), peaked at number four becoming her highest-charting album since Read My Lips. She released a Latin-inspired sixth studio album, Familia, in 2016 to critical acclaim.

Early life

Ellis-Bextor was born in London to Janet Ellis, who was a presenter on BBC's children's television programmes Blue Peter and Jigsaw, and Robin Bextor, a film producer and director; they separated when she was four. As a child, Ellis-Bextor occasionally appeared on Blue Peter alongside her mother who presented the programme.

She attended St. Stephen's School and later the independent Godolphin and Latymer School in Hammersmith. Among her earliest public performances were some with the W11 Opera children's opera beginning at the age of thirteen, and she is now a patron of the organisation.

Ellis-Bextor has said, "I didn't see myself as a good-looking girl and that was good, because I didn't rely on it.(…) I've now found lots of like-minded weirdos, so it's OK."

Career

1996–99: Theaudience

Ellis-Bextor began her professional musical career in 1996 while singing lead vocals in indie band Theaudience. The band released four singles, including the UK Top 40 hits "I Know Enough (I Don't Get Enough)", and "A Pessimist Is Never Disappointed", and one self-titled album (theaudience (1999)). Videos for the band's singles were directed by her father, Robin Bextor. While in Theaudience, readers of Melody Maker voted Ellis-Bextor number one in a poll of 'most sexy people in rock'.

The band split in 1999 after demos for a planned second album were rejected by their label Mercury Records, who then dropped the band. Ellis-Bextor recorded a duet with Manic Street Preachers — "Black Holes for the Young" — as a B-side for their 1998 single "The Everlasting", and in 1999, made an appearance on the Departure Lounge album Out of Here.

2000–2006: Read My Lips and  Shoot from the Hip 
After Theaudience split, Ellis-Bextor collaborated with Italian DJ Spiller, in 2000, adding vocals to his track "Groovejet (If This Ain't Love)". It entered the UK charts at number one, just beating former Spice Girl Victoria Beckham on her first solo track. "Groovejet" won several awards: No. 1, Pop Top 20; No. 1, ILR; No. 1, Radio 1; No. 8, top dance track of 2000 and single of the year in Melody Maker. In the Metro Newspaper, it received ninth place in the contest for the Greatest No. 1 of all time. In 2000, it was a finalist in The Record of the Year. In that same year, it won the awards for Best Single and Best Ibiza Tune at the Ericsson Muzik Awards.

In 2001, Ellis-Bextor released her début album, Read My Lips. It reached number two on the UK charts and spawned four top-twenty hit singles. Her rework of Cher's "Take Me Home" reached number two, as did "Murder on the Dancefloor", which became Ellis-Bextor's biggest single and was on charts for twenty-three weeks. "Murder on the Dancefloor" became Europe's most played song of 2002. In 2002, Read My Lips was re-released with two new songs (and a live version of "Groovejet") and Ellis-Bextor won the Recording Artist Award at that year's Showbusiness Awards. Her third single, "Get Over You / Move This Mountain", was released in June 2002 and reached number three. The fourth single, "Music Gets the Best of Me", rose to number fourteen in December. At the beginning of 2002, Ellis-Bextor was nominated for the "British Female Solo Artist" BRIT Award, going on to be nominated for a further two consecutive years.

Her second album, Shoot from the Hip, was released in October 2003 and yielded two further top-ten singles, "Mixed Up World" and "I Won't Change You". The album reached number 19 on the UK charts and was certified silver by the BPI for shipments of 60,000. Ellis-Bextor described the album as "more emotionally direct" and "a little more left-of-centre at times" than Read My Lips—"It has more of a live feel [...] It's still a pop album—with elements of disco, indie and rock." She opted to step back from promotion of the album after becoming pregnant.

In 2005, Ellis-Bextor was featured on the Busface single "Circles (Just My Good Time)" under the alias Mademoiselle E.B.

2007–2011: Trip the Light Fantastic and  Make a Scene 

Trip the Light Fantastic, Ellis-Bextor's third album, was released in May 2007 and reached number seven in the UK. The album produced three singles: "Catch You" (number 8 in the UK), "Me and My Imagination" (number 23), and "Today the Sun's on Us" (number 64). The song "If I Can't Dance" was announced as a single but later retracted.

Ellis-Bextor supported George Michael on his UK tour leg in June 2007. Her own UK tour, the Trip the Light Fantastic Tour, was due to start in August 2007, but it was postponed after Ellis-Bextor was invited to be the "special guest" on Take That's Beautiful World Tour, which commenced in October 2007. She stated that her tour would be rescheduled for March 2008, with all tickets purchased being valid for the rescheduled concerts. The tour was never rescheduled and Ellis-Bextor has refused to discuss the issue in interviews. In October 2008, she sang at the Keep the Promise Rally in Trafalgar Square to end Child Poverty.

In June 2009, Ellis-Bextor was featured on the Freemasons single "Heartbreak (Make Me a Dancer)", which reached number 13 in the UK. In July, she performed alongside girl groups The Saturdays and Girls Can't Catch at the iTunes Festival, held at the Roundhouse in London. A recording of her performance was released, Sophie Ellis-Bextor: iTunes Live in London, which was the singer's first extended play. "Bittersweet" (co-written by Freemasons and Hannah Robinson), the first single from Ellis-Bextor's fourth album, was released in May 2010 and reached 25 on the UK Singles Chart. Ellis-Bextor's collaboration with DJ Armin van Buuren, "Not Giving Up on Love", was released as a single in August 2010 in Europe.  Also in 2010, she was featured on the Junior Caldera single "Can't Fight This Feeling".

The singer's fourth album, Make a Scene, was released in June 2011 following a year-long delay during which she left her label Universal Music Group to establish her own label, EBGBs.
 She said that her decision to leave Universal was spurred on by the departure of the head of Fascination Records, the sub-label to which she was signed following the release of "Bittersweet". She described Make a Scene as "very much [a dance album]—more so than any of my other albums." She said she was planning an "album that's really different [...] but I think this album [Make a Scene] is a good way to bow out of the dance sound for now. I think it's finishing on a high." She supported Pet Shop Boys on the UK leg of their Pandemonium Tour in July 2010. She worked with Calvin Harris, Richard X, Dimitri Tikovoi, Hannah Robinson, Metronomy, and Liam Howe from the Sneaker Pimps. "Off & On" preceded the release of the album in continental Europe and Russia, where the album was released by Universal Music Russia. The single "Starlight" was released in the UK ahead of the album in May 2011.

Ellis-Bextor supported synth-pop band Erasure on their Total Pop! Forest tour of woodland locations in the UK in June 2011. She resumed touring internationally in 2011, playing venues such as Jakarta's SoulNation festival, as well as returning to Australia by performing in Sydney and Melbourne. She collaborated with French DJ Bob Sinclar on a track titled "F__ with You" (released in November 2011); it was included on his album Disco Crash and was a huge club hit in Continental Europe. Ellis-Bextor's collaboration with French DJ Mathieu Bouthier, "Beautiful", was released in July 2012 in France.

2012–2014: Wanderlust and collaborations
In May 2011, she revealed that she had begun work on her fifth album. Beginning in 2012, Ellis-Bextor worked with British singer and producer Ed Harcourt on a "more concept driven record", and possibly having as few as eight tracks. Her performance at a London charity gala in November 2012 including a new song, "Young Blood"; a demo of the song was released in March 2013 as a complimentary digital download from her website, as a thank you gift to her fans. Also in 2013, she performed outdoors at Old Republic Square in Almaty, Kazakhstan. Ellis-Bextor confirmed completion of the album in May and revealed its title, Wanderlust, and cover art in October.

"Young Blood" was released as the lead single from Wanderlust in November 2013, peaking at number three on the UK Indie Chart and at number 34 on the UK Singles Chart. The album was released in January 2014 and peaked at number four on the UK Albums Chart and at number one on the UK Independent Albums Chart. Wanderlust also debuted inside the Scottish Top 10 Albums Chart. Ellis-Bextor performed a headline sold-out show to support Wanderlusts release in January 2014 at Bush Hall, London, and also performed at Union Chapel, London in April. Ellis-Bextor then announced a 10-date UK tour, which finished in Glasgow in April 2014.

Ellis-Bextor collaborated with Guéna LG and Amir Afargan on the track "Back 2 Paradise", which was released in June 2014. The single was the number-one "breakout" in October 2014 on the US Billboard Dance/Club Chart, later reaching number 25 on the Dance/Club Chart. Ellis-Bextor then featured on the song "Only Child", produced by electronic music project DedRekoning, which was released in September 2014. The track was remixed by Paul Oakenfold, Roddy Reynaert and Pearson and Hirst.

2015–2019: Familia and The Song Diaries

In January 2015, Ellis-Bextor said that she had begun working on her sixth studio album, once again with Ed Harcourt. In January 2016, Ellis-Bextor posted an image on Instagram captioned "Last song written. Next stop – rehearsals! #album6 #whatthehellshouldicallit." She also posted a YouTube video of the making of the album.
According to Ellis-Bextor, the album, titled Familia, was inspired by a recent visit to North America, particularly Mexico. Familia is the Spanish word for "family" (a tattoo Ellis-Bextor wears in her arm since her first child's birth) and Ellis-Bextor described the album's sound as closer to that of her earlier albums. She explained that she "wanted something with a Spanish or Italian feel" and that it continued some stories from Wanderlust. Familia was released in September 2016 and reached number 12 on the UK Albums Chart. It spawned four singles, but none of them made it into any major chart. After taking time off for the birth of her child in late 2015, she resumed touring in 2017, mostly at small venues in the UK.

In November 2017, she announced via Facebook a selection of her greatest hits reworked with an orchestra. In February 2018, she announced the album's title, The Song Diaries, and pointed out that it would consist of re-recorded tracks spanning her career from theaudience to Familias "Wild Forever", plus a new track. The album's artwork was drawn by David Downtown. The Song Diaries first single "Love Is You", a disco track originally performed by Carol Williams, which is sampled on her early hit Groovejet, was released in August 2018. The Song Diaries was released in March 2019 and peaked at number 14 in the UK.

 2020–present: Songs from the Kitchen Disco and Hana

In 2020, during the COVID-19 pandemic lockdown in the UK, Ellis-Bextor performed live weekly "Kitchen Disco" concerts featuring herself and her family, streamed live from their kitchen on Instagram. Beginning 24 June 2020 Ellis-Bextor started a weekly podcast titled Spinning Plates with Sophie Ellis-Bextor on which she interviews working mothers. Guests have included Fearne Cotton, Caitlin Moran, Myleene Klass, Róisin Murphy, and Janet Ellis.

On 16 July 2020, Ellis-Bextor announced the greatest hits album Songs from the Kitchen Disco. The album was preceded by the release of a single, "Crying at the Discoteque", a cover version of the Alcazar song, which she had performed during her lockdown concerts in September 2020. She performed the single on The Graham Norton Show on New Years Eve. In March 2022, she embarked on her "Songs from the Kitchen Disco" tour of the U.K. In July 2022, the singer revealed a new single, "Hypnotized", a collaboration with electronic artist Wuh Oh and will feature on her upcoming seventh studio album. 

A live album was released in November 2022 entitled Kitchen Disco – Live at the London Palladium. 

In January 2023, Ellis-Bextor collaborated with Japanese/Australian duo RHYME SO on a cover of the Malcolm McLaren track, "Deep in Vogue".

On 8 February 2023, Bextor revealed a new track, "Breaking the Circle", which is the lead single from her upcoming seventh studio album, Hana, to be released by 2 June 2023. The title of the album was taken from the Japanese word for blossom. Ellis-Bextor said the album was inspired by a trip to Japan, taken before the COVID-19 pandemic began. Ellis-Bextor said of the album: "“Because I hadn’t been before, I had lots of ideas about what [Japan] might be like. The [album’s] soundscape is like someone’s idea of what a place might be like before they get there. That trip also became significant in a wider sense because it was the last bit of travel I did before everything shut down." Hana marks the third collaboration with producer/musician Ed Harcourt. Ellis-Bextor said "There are themes of optimism, new starts, adventures and reflections....This is our third record together after Wanderlust and Familia. The first songs written were really inspired by the upcoming trip to Japan. In the end, the album ended up being inspired by that trip and so much more."

Other projects
In 2001 Ellis-Bextor auditioned for the 2001 film Moulin Rouge! for the character, Satine. In 2007 she appeared at Christmas in the Robbie the Reindeer episode, "Close Encounters of the Herd Kind". She was depicted as a female alien at the closure of the story singing the song "Supersonic", the last track on her third solo studio album Trip the Light Fantastic. In November of the same year she also launched the npower Greener Schools Programme, which aims to give schools in the UK a 'green makeover' by providing free energy audits, implementing tailor-made energy efficiency measures to reduce their carbon footprint, and educating children on how to be greener She launched Capital Radio's Capital 95.8 'Lights Out London' campaign, which asks Londoners to switch off their lights for one hour in a bid to save 750 MWh and send a message to the world on the importance of climate change.

In 2008 she featured in the short musical film The Town that Boars Me by photographer Ben Charles Edwards. The film also features Jodie Harsh, Kelly Osbourne and Zandra Rhodes. The film was produced by Glass Loves and Shoot to Kill Productions and was set to début at the Portobello Film Festival. The same year she fronted a campaign for The Children's Society encouraging people to log onto the Hundreds and Thousands of Childhood Memories website to donate their favourite childhood memory. In May 2008 she was hired by cosmetics brand Rimmel to be one of their new faces. A song of hers, "Sophia Loren", was featured in one of the Rimmel London television adverts for the line "Sexy Curves". She appeared as an advocate for Verdi on BBC World News classical music programme Visionaries. She was a contestant in the eleventh series of the televised dance competition Strictly Come Dancing in late 2013. She was partnered with Brendan Cole and reached the final, placing fourth.

In September 2014, the Pretty Polly hosiery company announced that Ellis-Bextor was their latest "face and legs", and would be designing and modelling for them. In March 2019 Ellis-Bextor appeared as an extra in Game of Thrones, Season 8, Episode 3 "The Long Night". In July 2020 she started a podcast called Spinning Plates which focuses on mothers and their careers. In the same year she competed in the second series of The Masked Singer as Alien. She was the first celebrity to be unmasked. It was announced in October 2021 that she will make an appearance in the Australian soap opera Neighbours in 2022 when it airs a storyline in London. On the morning of 16 November 2021 Ellis-Bextor embarked upon a 24-hour "Kitchen Disco Danceathon", in aid of Children in Need. She raised over £1,000,000 for the cause. In December 2022, Ellis-Bextor partnered with Vodafone to unveil its Pro II Broadband during a special Christmas concert in London.

Personal life
Ellis-Bextor met her future husband, the Feeling bassist Richard Jones, when he auditioned for her tour band in 2002.  Jones has said, "Something kind of smacked us in the face. The chemistry was incredible—it was like nothing I've ever experienced." They married in 2005, 14 months after the birth of their first child. They have five sons. Their first child was born two months early, only eight months after the start of their relationship. Ellis-Bextor suffered from pre-eclampsia (the onset of high blood pressure) during her first two pregnancies, resulting in both deliveries being premature. She is an ambassador for Borne, a medical research charity looking into the causes of premature birth.

Sophie and her sons Kit and Sonny took part in Lego Masters Christmas Special 2022.

Political activity

In the 2019 EU Elections Ellis-Bextor endorsed The Independent Group for Change. Her father, Robin Bextor, was a candidate for the South East Region. He received 105,832 votes but lost his deposit, as he did not get at least 5% of the vote.

Awards and nominations

Current band members
 Phil Wilkinson – drums
 Richard Jones – bass
 Ciaran Jeremiah – keyboards
 Seton Daunt – guitar
 Gita Langley – backing vocals, violin

DiscographyStudio albums'''
 Read My Lips (2001)
 Shoot from the Hip (2003)
 Trip the Light Fantastic (2007)
 Make a Scene (2011)
 Wanderlust (2014)
 Familia (2016)
 Hana'' (2023)

Books

Tours

 Read My Lips Tour (2002–2003)
 Straight to the Heart Tour (2009–2010)
 Wanderlust Tour (2014)
 Familia Tour (2017)
 The Song Diaries Tour (2019)
 Kitchen Disco Tour (2022-2023)

Opening act
 25 Live (for George Michael) (2006)
 Beautiful World Tour (for Take That) (2007)
 Pandemonium Tour (for Pet Shop Boys) (2010)
 Total Pop! Forest Tour (for Erasure) (2011)
 Summer 2019 (for Kylie Minogue) (2019)
 What the Future Holds Tour (for Steps) (2021)
 The Wild Dreams Tour (for Westlife) (2022)

References

External links

 
 
 
 Sophie Ellis-Bextor's Kitchen Disco (BBC Radio 2)

 
1979 births
Living people
British disco musicians
English women singer-songwriters
English dance musicians
English women pop singers
English women DJs
National Youth Theatre members
Nu-disco musicians
Fascination Records artists
People educated at Godolphin and Latymer School
People from Hounslow
Polydor Records artists
Singers from London
Trip hop musicians
21st-century English women singers
21st-century English singers